François Georges Henri Marie Ghislain Joseph Damiens (born 17 January 1973) is a Belgian actor.

Career
He has appeared in more than fifty films since 2000. He started out doing hidden camera videos in the 90s and became widely popular in Belgium. He gained great popularity in Belgium and had to stop filming in 2004 because he could no longer play without being recognized; he then came to France to continue his activity. There, as in Switzerland, he acquired a certain celebrity thanks to the dissemination of his hoaxes on Canal+ and internet.

He made his directorial feature debut in 2018 with the drama film Mon Ket.

Personal life
He has two sons: Jack & Jimmy.

He is trilingual, in addition to French, he speaks Dutch and English.

Filmography

Dubbing

References

External links 

 
 

1973 births
Living people
People from Uccle
21st-century Belgian male actors
Belgian male film actors